William "Gipsy" Daniels (9 February 1903 – June 1967), was a Welsh Light-heavyweight boxing champion of Britain who, in an eighteen-year career, took in 141 contests, including eight fights in New York City, and notably knocked out Max Schmeling in the first round of a 1928 encounter.

There is some confusion as to Daniels' actual name and place of birth. Though a definitive answer was given in Tony Lee's 2009 publication which printed a copy of his birth certificate. Daniels was born in Llanelli on 9 February 1903 as William Daniel to David John Daniel and Francis Ann Roberts. His father was a successful rugby player who represented Llanelli and Wales.

Boxing career
Daniels began his career boxing in contests in his home area of South Wales, and as an eighteen-year-old he fought under the name "Young Daniel" as a middleweight. By the end of 1920 he was boxing in Kent, and managed to win a couple of fights against similarly inexperienced opposition. On 24 February 1921, Daniels fought his first veteran boxer when he was carded to face Belgian Rene DeVos at The Ring in Blackfriars, London. DeVos already had 58 bouts under his belt, 37 of them wins, including a defeat over Daniels' fellow countryman Frank Moody. Daniels lost the 20 round fight on points.

By the end of 1921, Daniels had amassed a fighting record of eleven wins, six losses and two draws. In March 1922 he won a heavyweight competition at Blackfriars, and in October of that year he was fighting at the Pioneer Sporting Club in New York. It was around this time that Daniels was introduced to James J. Johnston, a local boxing promoter. Johnston decided that Daniels needed a gimmick to sell himself to the public, and decided that he looked "like a gypsy". Johnston took Daniels to a Woolworths five-and-ten-cent store and dressed him in cheap bandanna headscarves and hooped earrings. Johnston dubbed him 'Gypsey Daniels', though the most commonly used spelling of his nickname was 'Gipsy'. Daniels fought eight times in New York, including two contests at Madison Square Garden, before returning to Great Britain.

Daniels continued fighting in Wales and England, but in September 1925 he travelled to mainland Europe for the first time in his career, to face Swedish boxer Harry Persson at the Cirkus in Stockholm. Although Daniels lost the bout on points, on his return to Britain he began his most successful period of boxing, remaining undefeated for the next 18 fights. After a win over Frank Moody in April 1927 which earned him the Welsh Light Heavyweight belt, Daniels faced Tom Berry for the British Light-Heavyweight Championship Belt. Daniels won the 20 round bout on points, but he faced a dilemma as to whether to defend the title as the National Sporting Club (NSC), who controlled boxing in Great Britain, offered far lower purses than outside promoters. Daniels chose to fight for a non-NSC affiliated promoter to maximise his income, giving up his newly acquired title.

In January 1928, Daniels lost a bout to German, Max Schmeling followed by a defeat to Len Johnson, but in a rematch with Schmeling on 25 February he knocked out the German in the first round. Daniels career continued without the success of his earlier years, losing twice to Walter Neusel in Germany, but beating and drawing with Jack London before London became British and Commonwealth Champion.

Professional boxing record

See also
 List of British light-heavyweight boxing champions

Bibliography

References

External links

Welsh male boxers
Light-heavyweight boxers
1903 births
1967 deaths
Sportspeople from Llanelli